Pakhomy Ivanovich Adreyushkin (May 15, 1865 – May 8, 1887) was a Russian revolutionary, member of Narodnaya Volya ("People's Will"), a secret terrorist organization meant to overthrow the Russian tsar.

In 1886, Andreyushkin enrolled in St. Petersburg University. That same year, he became a member of the "Terrorist Faction" of Narodnaya Volya and, together with Aleksandr Ulyanov and others, took part in planning the assassination of Tsar Alexander III.

Andreyushkin was arrested on March 1, 1887. On May 8, he was executed at the Shlisselburg Fortress.

References

1865 births
1887 deaths
Russian revolutionaries
Executed revolutionaries
People executed by the Russian Empire
Executed Russian people
19th-century executions by the Russian Empire